Gymnobela africana is a species of sea snail, a marine gastropod mollusk in the family Raphitomidae.

Description
The length of the shell attains 54.7 mm, its diameter 22.7 mm.

Distribution
This marine species occurs off Kenya.

References

Further reading
 Sysoev, A.V. (1996b) Deep-sea conoidean gastropods collected by the John Murray Expedition, 1933–34. Bulletin of the Natural History Museum of London, Zoology, 62, 1–30

External links
 

africana
Gastropods described in 1996